National Geographic is a French television channel that broadcasts documentaries and factual programmes produced by National Geographic Society in French. It was launched on 22 September 2001 on CanalSatellite and cable television.

In 2014, National Geographic became a free channel on French IPTV platforms, but it become again a Canal exclusive in 2018.

References

External links
 Official website

Television stations in France
French-language television stations
Television channels and stations established in 2001
2001 establishments in France
France